Winogradskyella epiphytica is a Gram-negative and aerobic bacterium from the genus of Winogradskyella which has been isolated from algae.

References

Flavobacteria
Bacteria described in 2005